Pablo Torres Tapia (born June 26, 1908) was a Filipino banker and lawyer who received the Ramon Magsaysay Award for Community Leadership in 1964. His contributions to the community involved establishing a rural bank aimed at providing loans for farmers, educating the farmers with the latest farming developments, and setting up the Tanauan Farmers Marketing Cooperative (FACOMA).

References

External links
 Ramon Magsaysay Award Foundation

Ramon Magsaysay Award winners
1967 deaths
1908 births
Filipino bankers
People from Tanauan, Batangas